Ononitol is a cyclitol. It is a 4-O-methyl-myo-inositol and is a constituent of Medicago sativa.

References

Cyclitols